Sonority is an album by American jazz bassist Curtis Counce featuring recordings from 1956 to 1958 which was released on the Contemporary label in 1989.

Reception
The Allmusic review by Scott Yanow states "The playing is quite rewarding, and all four of the Counce reissues are easily recommended to hard bop collectors".

Track listing
All compositions by Elmo Hope except as indicated
 "Woody 'n' You" (Dizzy Gillespie) - 6:23
 "How Long Has This Been Going On?" (George Gershwin, Ira Gershwin) - 3:20
 "Landslide" [alternate take] (Harold Land) - 9:03
 "Sonor" [alternate take] (Kenny Clarke, Gerald Wiggins) - 5:18
 "So Nice" - 5:25
 "Origin" - 4:43
 "Bella Rosa" - 6:11
 "A Night in Tunisia" (Gillespie, Frank Paparelli) - 8:20 		
 "A Drum Conversation" (Frank Butler) - 2:22 Bonus track on CD reissue 	  
Recorded at Contemporary Studios in Los Angeles, CA on October 15, 1956 (tracks 1, 3 & 4), April 22, 1957 (track 9), August 29, 1957 (track 2) and January 6, 1958 (tracks 5-9)

Personnel
Curtis Counce - bass
Jack Sheldon (tracks 1-4 & 9), Gerald Wilson (tracks 5-8) - trumpet
Harold Land - tenor saxophone
Elmo Hope (tracks 5-7), Carl Perkins (tracks 1-4, 8 & 9) - piano
Frank Butler - drums

References

Contemporary Records albums
Curtis Counce albums
1989 albums